American Reunion (also known as American Pie 4: Reunion or American Pie: Reunion in certain countries) is a 2012 American ensemble sex comedy film written and directed by Jon Hurwitz and Hayden Schlossberg. It is the fourth installment in the American Pie theatrical series. The film received mixed reviews from critics, and grossed $235 million worldwide.

Plot
 
Thirteen years after their high school graduation, Jim Levenstein lives in the Chicago area with his wife Michelle and their two-year-old son. Chris "Oz" Ostreicher works as a sportscaster in LA with his unfaithful supermodel girlfriend Mia and is clearly unhappy, Kevin is married and works from home as an architect, Paul Finch tells his friends that he has been traveling the world, and Steven Stifler works as an office temp for a verbally abusive boss.

Former classmate John, one half of the "MILF" duo, organizes the Class of 1999 high school reunion in East Great Falls, Michigan. Jim and Michelle return to Jim's dad's house, where he encounters his neighbor Kara, whom he used to babysit, and is almost 18. 

At a local bar, Jim, Oz, Kevin, and Finch meet Selena, Michelle's friend from band, and Stifler appears unexpectedly. The next day, at the beach, Oz meets his high school girlfriend, Heather, who is dating a cardiologist, Ron, and Kevin reconnects with high school sweetheart Vicky. Stifler destroys Kara's boyfriend's jet-ski, much to the disapproval of the guys. That night, they stumble upon Kara's birthday party. Kara gets drunk; Jim drives her home, and she tries to seduce him. Kevin wakes up next to Vicky and assumes they had drunken sex.

Jim and Michelle attend a party hosted by Stifler and bring Jim's widower dad along, who Stifler gets drunk. Kevin confronts Vicky who maintains they did not have sex. Mia takes ecstasy, and Ron humiliates Oz. Heather comforts Oz, and they reconcile before Mia and she get into a fight. Jim's dad meets Stifler's mom.

Michelle, concerned about the recent lack of sex in their marriage, attempts to have BDSM sex with Jim but is interrupted by Kara. Her boyfriend arrives and a fight breaks out between his friends and Jim's. Michelle finds out that Kara seduced Jim and tried to lose her virginity to him. Jim tells Michelle he does not care about Kara. Upset, both Kara and Michelle leave. The police arrest Finch for stealing his boss's motorcycle, which Stifler thinks is funny. Exasperated by Stiffler's immaturity, the guys rally to Finch's side, reiterating they dislike Stifler. Distraught, Stifler ends the party.

The next morning, Jim's dad offers him advice on how to fix his marriage. Finch admits to being an assistant manager at Staples. The boys ultimately learn that despite Stifler's immature behavior, he genuinely cares about them. They then apologize to him, they also sympathize with him when they realize how unhappy he is, and insist that high school would not have been fun without him. 

Stifler quits his job but not before standing up to his boss and they head to the reunion together: Kevin reconciles with Vicky; Finch makes amends for lying to Selena; Oz reunites with Heather after breaking up with Mia and Stifler punches Ron for threatening Oz. Jim reconciles with Michelle and Nadia (who appears with a man by her side) interrupts them having sex but is pleased to see them still together. Jessica reveals that she is a lesbian, and with Stifler's help, Sherman hooks up with Loni. 

Stifler is offered work as a wedding planner. He then meets Rachel Finch (Paul Finch's mom) who makes a brazen sexual pass at him and they proceed to have sex on the lacrosse field. John is reunited with his estranged buddy, Justin, and they watch Stifler having sex with Mrs. Finch while shouting “MILF!” from the bleachers.

The next morning: Jim and Kara apologize to each other; Oz plans to stay in town with Heather; Finch plans a trip with Selena to Europe; and Stifler drops subtle hints about sleeping with Finch's mom. Kevin proposes a pact for them to reunite once a year.

In a mid-credits scene, Jim's dad gets fellatio from Stifler's mom in a movie theater.

Cast

Production

Development
In October 2008, Universal Pictures announced it was planning to produce a fourth theatrically released sequel to the first film. In , the film entered pre-production, with Jon Hurwitz and Hayden Schlossberg signing on to write and direct with plans to reunite the whole cast of the primary series.

Casting
In , it was announced that Jason Biggs, Seann William Scott and Eugene Levy had signed on to reprise their roles. Biggs and Scott were granted executive producer credits and also helped convince the other previous cast members to return. In , Alyson Hannigan, Chris Klein, and Mena Suvari signed on. The following month, Thomas Ian Nicholas, Tara Reid, Eddie Kaye Thomas, Shannon Elizabeth, and Jennifer Coolidge signed on.

On , a casting call went out for the character "Kara", a role that involved "upper frontal nudity". Ali Cobrin was cast in the role. National Football League wide receiver Chad Ochocinco and actor Neil Patrick Harris have cameo roles.

Jason Biggs and Seann William Scott each received a reported $5 million plus a percentage of the profits for their performances. Alyson Hannigan and Eugene Levy were said to have been paid $3 million each, with the rest of the cast receiving payments within the $500,000 to $700,000 range, except Tara Reid, who was paid $250,000.

Filming
In late June, filming took place at Conyers, Monroe and Woodruff Park. While in Conyers, filming took place at Heritage High School’s football stadium and band room. Scenes were filmed at the school's gym for a reunion prom set, football field, commons area and hallways; which included 200 extras. Under the deal the production company paid $10,000 to the Newton County School System for using the school.

During the last week of July, production moved to Cumming to film at Mary Alice Park on Lake Lanier and included about 100 extras. Moore said the beach at the lake looks similar to a Lake Michigan setting, which is the state in which the film is set. The production company paid $23,000 to have full access to the property for a week.

Release

Box office
American Reunion opened in North America on April 6, 2012 in 3,192 theaters for a weekend total of $21,514,080, putting it at number 2 at the box office behind The Hunger Games. On its second week of release, it dropped to number 5 at the box office with a weekend total of $10,473,810.

The film earned $56,758,835 in North America and $177,978,063 internationally, for a worldwide total of $234,736,898.

Home video
The DVD and Blu-ray discs were released on July 10, 2012 in North America. The film was also released in a box set titled the "American Pie Quadrilogy" on August 22, 2012 in Australia. The theatrical version was available on iTunes a few days ahead of time, as an "Early Digital Release". It was released on September 10, 2012 in the United Kingdom.

Reception
On Rotten Tomatoes, the film a holds an approval rating of 45% based on 183 reviews, with an average rating of 5.21/10. The site's critical consensus reads, "It'll provide sweetly nostalgic comfort food for fans of the franchise, but American Reunion fails to do anything truly new or interesting – or even very funny – with the characters." On Metacritic, the film has a weighted average score of 49 out of 100, based on 34 critics, indicating "mixed or average reviews". Audiences polled by CinemaScore gave the film an average grade of "B+" on an A+ to F scale.

According to Roger Ebert, who gave the film three out of four stars:
The charm of American Pie was the relative youth and naïveté of the characters. It was all happening for the first time, and they had the single-minded obsession with sex typical of many teenagers. American Reunion has a sense of déjà-vu, but it still delivers a lot of nice laughs. Most of them for me came thanks to Stifler... If you liked the earlier films, I suppose you gotta see this one. Otherwise, I dunno.

The Village Voice concludes its review with the following:
After some strained "Remember the time . . ." callbacks to 13-year-old gags, American Reunion gets comfortable and funny, as Hurwitz and Schlossberg hit familiar marks from unexpected angles, while the ensemble interplay is "routine" in the best sense of the word. Taken altogether, the Pie movies offer a cohesive worldview, showing each of life's stages as the setting for fresh-yet-familiar catastrophes, relieved by a belief in sex, however ridiculous it might look, as a restorative force. The recipe is so durable and the sustained character work so second-skin by now, one can imagine the Pie films keeping with the dramatis personae through middle age and into the problems of geriatric love, a raunch-comic version of Britain's documentary Up series. American Midlife Crisis? American Retirement? American Funeral? Let's go!

Peter Travers of Rolling Stone gave American Reunion a positive review of two and half stars out of four saying, "American Reunion reminds us what we liked about the original: the way the movie sweetened its raunch to build a rooting interest in these characters."

Accolades

Soundtrack

The two score tracks were recorded by a 60-70 piece orchestra 
conducted by John Ashton Thomas who also orchestrated Workman's score 
for the orchestral sessions.
The orchestra was recorded at the Eastwood Scoring Stage at the 
Warner Bros. lot by Shawn Murphy who also mixed the score.

Future
In August 2017, Seann William Scott said in an interview that the fourth film probably had not made enough at the domestic box office to warrant another film. In August 2018, Tara Reid said she met with the directors, with them saying that the fifth film will happen, and that filming could begin soon.

References

External links

 
 
 
 
 
 

2012 films
2010s sex comedy films
American Pie (film series)
American sequel films
American sex comedy films
Class reunions in popular culture
2010s English-language films
Films about families
Films about virginity
Films about widowhood in the United States
Films set in 2012
Films set in Michigan
Films shot in Georgia (U.S. state)
Relativity Media films
Universal Pictures films
2012 comedy films
Films scored by Lyle Workman
2010s American films